Chagasia is one of the three mosquito genera in the subfamily Anophelinae. The other two genera are Anopheles Meigen (nearly worldwide distribution) and Bironella Theobald (Australia only). The subfamily consists of five species in the Neotropical region. These include C. ablusa Harbach, C. bathana Dyar, C. bonneae Root, C. fajardi Lutz and C. rozeboomi Causey, Deane & Deane. 

Bironella appears to be the sister taxon to Anopheles, with Chagasia forming the outgroup in this subfamily.

The species Chagasia bathana has 8 chromosomes and males are heterogametic with one long X chromosome and one short Y chromosome.

See also
 List of mosquito genera
 Taxonomy of Anopheles

References

Notes
 Cruz, O. G. 1906. Um novo genero da sub-familia Anophelina [sic]. Brazil-Médico 20: 199-200.
 Edwards, F. W. 1932. Genera Insectorum. Diptera. Family Culicidae. Fascicle 194. Belgium, 258 pp.
 Harbach, R.E.; Howard, T.M. 2009: Review of the genus Chagasia (Diptera: Culicidae: Anophelinae). Zootaxa, 2210: 1-25.

External links
 

Anophelinae
Mosquito genera